Funland Hayling Island is an amusement park on Hayling Island, near Portsmouth, England.

Funland Hayling Island contains 18 rides, an amusement arcade (as well as various independently operating arcades nearby), Diane's Diner, a kids' play area and a pirate-themed golf course.

The park is a typical funfair-styled park with the rides mainly being travelling rides from various independent funfair operators, with some rides sourced from other amusement parks.

History
Funland amusement park opened in 1984 on the site of a former Butlins which dated back to the 1930s. In 1977 the freehold for the land was passed from Billy Butlin to the Hill family who had been tenants on the land since the 1940s. The Hills built the park and upcycled signage from a nearby closed amusement arcade known as Funland. The modern Funland has survived three generations with the Hill family and is currently operated by Marshall Hill.

2000's
The 2003 season saw the addition of some brand new rides: The first was Tornado, a frisbee ride. Other rides that were added were a Breakdance, and a themed Teacups ride called Cannibal Pots. The park's Pirate Ship was also removed that year.

In 2004, a new larger Pirate Ship ride named Galleon was added to the park, replacing the older smaller ship. The Park's Zyclone coaster was removed from the park that year.

For the 2005 season, after the Zyclone coaster was sold to Tier Prince Fun Park, the park purchased Drayton Manor's Klondike Gold Mine coaster. The Drop Tower formerly sourced at the Trocadero was finally added to the park after two years of troubled planning permissions.

In 2006, the park added a second smaller Log Flume in the park's former car parking lot called Blizzard Falls. In 2007, the Tornado Frisbee ride was replaced with a new model called Tornado 2.

In 2008, Funland purchased many rides from Drayton Manor's Robinsons Land section after its transformation into Thomas Land. Rides that were added were the Super Dragon coaster, the Whirlycopters, the Frog Hopper, Cadbury's Junior Pirate Ship and the Samba Balloons. At the end of the season, the Galleon Pirate Ship and the Junior Pirate Ship were closed and sold.

For the 2009 season, a Plane Ride was added.

2010's
No new rides were added in 2010, however Tornado 2 was sold onto independent operators after that year. A traveling orbiter ride named Speed Flip was added to the park for the 2011 season alongside 2012 to replace it.

The 2013 season saw the park purchase a Miami Extreme ride from an independent operator, while the 2014 season saw the park purchase a traveling Twister ride, named Cyclone, which was added to the park that year replacing Breakdancer, which was sold to Luna Park Sunny Beach. 2014 also saw the removal of Toy Town Express.

The 2015 season saw two-new rides added to the park; A pirate-ship-themed Galleon ride, alongside a new addition to the park's Dinosaur-themed section called Jurassic Safari, a car ride that replaced the Toy Town Express convoy ride. The Blizzard Falls log flume was renamed to Dino Falls in order to match the theme.

In 2016 a new roller coaster replacing the Klondike Gold Mine, which is called Runaway Mine Train, originally located at Gulliver's World as the Wild Mine Ride. In June, the park added a new Snake Helter-Skelter ride replacing the old one, and the Super Dragon returned after a refurbishment with a new dinosaur theme and name; Funlandosarus. After the 2016 season ended the Woody Coaster was removed from the park.

In 2017, two new rides were opened: A Tilt-A-Whirl called Neptune's Fury, which replaced the Woody Coaster, and a Mini Paratrooper ride. Both had been acquired from Pleasure Island Family Theme Park after its closure in 2016. The Mini Paratrooper was later replaced with a Carousel that was purchased from the Liseburg amusement park in Sweden, which the park has since purchased some rides from. The Drop Tower was removed from the park after the end of the 2017 season after standing there but not operating.

For 2018, a caterpillar-themed Rock 'n' Tug ride was added to the park. No new rides were added in 2019. After the 2019 season the Super Dragon was removed from the park and sold.

2020's
In 2020, Funland purchased a Flying Elephants ride and a Viking ride from Liseburg.

In 2021, the tarpaulin was removed from the middle of the park. a Ghost Train called "Destination Z" was added to the park upon opening for the 2021 season.

Rides

Rollercoasters

Dark Rides

Flat Rides

Water Rides

Children's Rides and Attractions

Removed Attractions

Incidents

On 17 September 2015, a 47-year-old Romanian workman fell 23 metres from the Kondlike Gold Mine ride, as he was taking the coaster down for its sell-out to Euroshow, breaking his arm and leg in the process.

References

External links
Official Website

Amusement parks in England
Buildings and structures in Hampshire
Tourist attractions in Hampshire
Hayling Island